Cajsa Persson (born 28 September 1993) is a Swedish professional golfer who plays on the Ladies European Tour.

Persson was born in Jönköping, Sweden. She played college golf in the United States for four years at Iowa State University with the Iowa State Cyclones. She turned professional in 2016 and earned her 2017 Ladies European Tour card after finishing 11th at the Lalla Aicha Tour Final Qualifying in Morocco. She won gold at the 2018 European Golf Team Championships together with Linda Wessberg, earning LET exemption status of Ranking Tournament Winner.

Team appearances
Professional
European Championships (representing Sweden): 2018  (winner – women's team)

Notes and references

External links

Swedish female golfers
Ladies European Tour golfers
Iowa State Cyclones women's golfers
Sportspeople from Jönköping
1993 births
Living people
21st-century Swedish women